Zhou Zhi may refer to:

 Zhou Zhi (Jin dynasty), Western Jin general
 Louise Chow or Zhou Zhi, Taiwanese scientist
 Chow Chih, Chinese general in the National Revolutionary Army

See also
 Zhouzhi County